Australobatrachia ("southern frogs") is a clade of frogs in the suborder Neobatrachia. It comprises three families of frogs with a Gondwanan distribution, being known from Chile, Australia, and New Guinea. Together, they form the sister group to the superfamily Hyloidea.

Taxonomy 
The common ancestor of all three families inhabited South America during the Early Cretaceous (about 125 million years ago). By about 100 million years ago, the ancestors of the Calyptocephalellidae diverged from the Myobatrachoidea, as the ancestral Myobatrachoidea moved south, colonizing the Australian continent via then-unglaciated Antarctica. The two families within Myobatrachoidea diverged from each other later in the Cretaceous or during the earliest Paleocene.

Australobatrachia contains the following subgroups:

 Calyptocephalellidae  - Chilean toads (5 species)
 Myobatrachoidea
 Limnodynastidae  - Australian ground frogs (44 species)
 Myobatrachidae  - Australian froglets and Australian toadlets (91 species)

References 

 
Neobatrachia
Tetrapod unranked clades
Taxa named by Darrel Frost